The 2012 M&M Meat Shops Canadian Junior Curling Championships were held from February 4 to 12 at the Strathcona Paper Centre and the Napanee & District Curling Club in Napanee, Ontario. The winners, the Albertan teams skipped by Brendan Bottcher and Jocelyn Peterman, represented Canada at the 2012 World Junior Curling Championships in Östersund, Sweden.

In the women's final, Alberta's Peterman led her team to a win over Manitoba's Shannon Birchard in nine ends, winning with a score of 12–6 after a decisive shot in the fourth end and a critical steal in the fifth end gave Alberta a large lead. The men's final saw Alberta's Brendan Bottcher sealing off the game against Northern Ontario's Brennan Wark in the last end with two points, making the final score 9–6 and completing an Alberta sweep of the Canadian Juniors.

Men

Teams
Teams are listed as follows:

Round-robin standings
Final round-robin standings

Round-robin results
Sheets A through E are located at the Strathcona Paper Centre, and sheets F through H are located at the Napanee & District Curling Club. All times listed are in Eastern Standard Time.

Draw 1
Saturday, February 4, 10:00 am

Draw 2
Saturday, February 4, 2:30 pm

Draw 3
Saturday, February 4, 7:00 pm

Draw 4
Sunday, February 5, 10:00 am

Draw 5
Sunday, February 5, 2:30 pm

Draw 6
Sunday, February 5, 7:00 pm

Draw 7
Monday, February 6, 10:00 am

Draw 8
Monday, February 6, 2:30 pm

Draw 9
Monday, February 6, 7:00 pm

Draw 10
Tuesday, February 7, 10:00 am

Draw 11
Tuesday, February 7, 3:30 pm

Draw 12
Tuesday, February 7, 7:00 pm

Draw 13
Wednesday, February 8, 10:00 am

Draw 14
Wednesday, February 8, 2:30 pm

Draw 15
Wednesday, February 8, 7:00 pm

Draw 16
Thursday, February 9, 10:00 am

Draw 17
Thursday, February 9, 3:30 pm

Draw 18
Thursday, February 9, 7:00 pm

Draw 19
Friday, February 10, 8:00 am

Draw 20
Friday, February 10, 1:00 pm

Tiebreaker
Saturday, February 11, 2:00 pm

Playoffs

Semifinal
Sunday, February 12, 1:00 pm

Final
Sunday, February 12, 7:00 pm

Women

Teams
Teams are listed as follows:

Round-robin standings
Final round-robin standings

Round-robin results
Sheets A through E are located at the Strathcona Paper Centre, and sheets F through H are located at the Napanee & District Curling Club. All times listed are in Eastern Standard Time.

Draw 1
Saturday, February 4, 10:00 am

Draw 2
Saturday, February 4, 2:30 pm

Draw 3
Saturday, February 4, 7:00 pm

Draw 4
Sunday, February 5, 10:00 am

Draw 5
Sunday, February 5, 2:30 pm

Draw 6
Sunday, February 5, 7:00 pm

Draw 7
Monday, February 6, 10:00 am

Draw 8
Monday, February 6, 2:30 pm

Draw 9
Monday, February 6, 7:00 pm

Draw 10
Tuesday, February 7, 10:00 am

Draw 11
Tuesday, February 7, 2:30 pm

Draw 12
Tuesday, February 7, 7:00 pm

Draw 13
Wednesday, February 8, 10:00 am

Draw 14
Wednesday, February 8, 2:30 pm

Draw 15
Wednesday, February 8, 7:00 pm

Draw 16
Thursday, February 9, 10:00 am

Draw 17
Thursday, February 9, 3:30 pm

Draw 18
Thursday, February 9, 7:00 pm

Draw 19
Friday, February 10, 8:00 am

Draw 20
Friday, February 10, 1:00 pm

Playoffs

Semifinal
Saturday, February 11, 2:00 pm

Final
Saturday, February 11, 7:00 pm

Awards
The all-star teams and award winners are as follows:

All-Star Teams
Women
First Team
Skip:  Selena Kaatz, Manitoba (fourth)
Third:  Kalia Van Osch, British Columbia
Second:  Kristin MacCuish, Manitoba
Lead:  Mariah Mondor, Manitoba

Second Team
Skip:  Kesa Van Osch, British Columbia
Third:  Shannon Birchard, Manitoba
Second:  Marika Van Osch, British Columbia
Lead:  Chantal Allan, Ontario

Men
First Team
Skip:  Brendan Bottcher, Alberta
Third:  Quinn Hersikorn, Saskatchewan
Second:  Landon Bucholz, Alberta
Lead:  Brady Kendel, Saskatchewan

Second Team
Skip:  Kyle Doering, Manitoba
Third:  Kristofer Leupen, Northern Ontario
Second:  Jacob Hersikorn, Saskatchewan
Lead:  Lucas Van Den Bosch, Manitoba

Ken Watson Sportsmanship Awards
Women
 Jess Cunningham, Newfoundland and Labrador second
Men
 Evan Asmussen, Alberta third

Fair Play Awards
Women
Lead:  Hillary Thompson, Prince Edward Island
Second:  Jess Cunningham, Newfoundland and Labrador
Third:  Marissa Gale, New Brunswick
Skip:  Emily Dwyer, Nova Scotia
Coach:  Angela Hodgson, Prince Edward Island

Men
Lead:  Brett Spier, Ontario
Second:  Landon Bucholz, Alberta
Third:  Chris MacRae, New Brunswick
Skip:  Daniel Murray, Northwest Territories
Coach:  Calvin Edie, Manitoba

ASHAM National Coaching Awards
Women
 Angela Hodgson, Prince Edward Island
Men
 Kevin Patterson, Nova Scotia

Joan Mead Legacy Awards
Women
 Nicole Noseworthy, Newfoundland and Labrador lead
Men
 Félix Asselin, Quebec skip

Qualification

Ontario
The Pepsi Ontario Junior Curling Championships were held January 4–8 at the Russell Curling Club in Russell.

Results:  

Playoffs
Men's tiebreakers: Brandon 8-5 Lyon-Hatcher; Krell 7-5 Brandon
Men's semi final: Krell 7-5 Lewis
Men's final: DeKoning 7-4 Krell
Women's semi final: Sinclair 8, Romain 6
Women's final: Sinclair 9, Horton 3

References

External links
Home Page

Junior Curling Championships
Canadian Junior Curling Championships
Canadian Junior Curling Championships
Canadian Junior Curling Championships
Curling in Ontario